Mordellistena palawana is a species of beetle in the family Mordellidae. It was described by Maurice Pic in 1927 based on material from Palawan, the Philippines.

References

palawana
Beetles of Asia
Insects of the Philippines
Fauna of Palawan
Beetles described in 1927
Taxa named by Maurice Pic